The Pulitzer Prize jury has the option of awarding special citations and awards where they consider necessary. 

Prizes for the award vary. The Pulitzer Prize Board has stated that the Special Citations given to George Gershwin, Thelonious Monk, John Coltrane and Duke Ellington were in response to criticism for the failure of the Board to cite the four.

On May 4, 2020, Ida B. Wells was announced as the recipient of a Pulitzer Special Citation "[f]or her outstanding and courageous reporting on the horrific and vicious violence against African Americans during the era of lynching." The Pulitzer Prize board announced that it would donate at least $50,000 in support of Wells' mission to recipients who would be announced at a later date. No specific category was announced for this citation.

On 11 June 2021, Darnella Frazier was announced as  the recipient of a Pulitzer Special Citation.

Journalism awards

Letters awards

Arts awards

Pulitzer Prize service awards

References

Special Citations and Awards